{{DISPLAYTITLE:Gi alpha subunit}}

Gi protein alpha subunit is a family of heterotrimeric G protein alpha subunits. This family is also commonly called the Gi/o (Gi /Go ) family or Gi/o/z/t family to include closely related family members. G alpha subunits may be referred to as Gi alpha, Gαi, or Giα.

Family members 
There are four distinct subtypes of alpha subunits in the Gi/o/z/t alpha subunit family that define four families of heterotrimeric G proteins: 
 Gi proteins: Gi1α, Gi2α, and Gi3α
 Go protein: Goα (in mouse there is alternative splicing to generate Go1α and Go2α)
 Gz protein: Gzα
 Transducins (Gt proteins): Gt1α, Gt2α, Gt3α

Giα proteins

Gi1α  
Gi1α is encoded by the gene GNAI1.

Gi2α  
Gi2α is encoded by the gene GNAI2.

Gi3α  
Gi3α is encoded by the gene GNAI3.

Goα protein  
Go1α is encoded by the gene GNAO1.

Gzα protein 
Gzα is encoded by the gene GNAZ.

Transducin proteins

Gt1α 
Transducin/Gt1α is encoded by the gene GNAT1.

Gt2α 
Transducin 2/Gt2α is encoded by the gene GNAT2.

Gt3α 

Gustducin/Gt3α is encoded by the gene GNAT3.

Function 

The general function of Gi/o/z/t is to activate intracellular signaling pathways in response to activation of cell surface  G protein-coupled receptors (GPCRs). GPCRs function as part of a three-component system of receptor-transducer-effector. The transducer in this system is a heterotrimeric G protein, composed of three subunits: a Gα protein such as Giα, and a complex of two tightly linked proteins called Gβ and Gγ in a Gβγ complex. When not stimulated by a receptor, Gα is bound to GDP and to Gβγ to form the inactive G protein trimer. When the receptor binds an activating ligand outside the cell (such as a hormone or neurotransmitter), the activated receptor acts as a guanine nucleotide exchange factor to promote GDP release from and GTP binding to Gα, which drives dissociation of GTP-bound Gα from Gβγ. GTP-bound Gα and Gβγ are then freed to activate their respective downstream signaling enzymes.

Gi proteins primarily inhibit the cAMP dependent pathway by inhibiting adenylyl cyclase activity, decreasing the production of cAMP from ATP, which, in turn, results in decreased activity of cAMP-dependent protein kinase. Therefore, the ultimate effect of Gi is the inhibition of the cAMP-dependent protein kinase. The Gβγ liberated by activation of Gi and Go proteins is particularly able to activate downstream signaling to effectors such as G protein-coupled inwardly-rectifying potassium channels (GIRKs). Gi and Go proteins are substrates for pertussis toxin, produced by Bordetella pertussis, the infectious agent in Whooping cough. Pertussis toxin is an ADP-ribosylase enzyme that adds an ADP-ribose moiety to a particular cysteine residue in Giα and Goα proteins, preventing their coupling to and activation by GPCRs, thus turning off Gi and Go cell signaling pathways.

Gz proteins also can link GPCRs to inhibition of adenylyl cyclase, but Gz is distinct from Gi/Go by being insensitive to inhibition by pertussis toxin.

Gt proteins function in sensory transduction. The Transducins Gt1 and Gt2 serve to transduce signals from G protein-coupled receptors that receive light during vision. Rhodopsin in dim light night vision in retinal rod cells couples to Gt1, and color photopsins in color vision in retinal cone cells couple to Gt2, respectively. Gt3/Gustducin subunits transduce signals in the sense of taste (gustation) in taste buds by coupling to G protein-coupled receptors activated by sweet or bitter substances.

Receptors 

The following G protein-coupled receptors couple to Gi/o subunits:

 Acetylcholine M2 & M4 receptors
 Adenosine A1 & A3 receptors
 Adrenergic α2A, α2B, & α2C receptors
 Apelin receptors
 Calcium-sensing receptor
 Cannabinoid receptors (CB1 and CB2)
 Chemokine CXCR4 receptor
 Dopamine D2, D3, D4
 GABAB receptor
 Glutamate mGlu2, mGlu3, mGlu4, mGlu6, mGlu7, & mGlu8 receptors
 Histamine H3 & H4 receptors
 Melatonin MT1, MT2, & MT3 receptors
 Hydroxycarboxylic acid receptors: HCA1, HCA2, & HCA3
 Opioid δ, κ, μ, & nociceptin receptors
 Prostaglandin EP1, EP3, FP, & TP receptors
 Serotonin 5-HT1 & 5-HT5 receptors
 Short chain fatty acid receptors: FFAR2 & FFAR3
 Somatostatin sst1, sst2, sst3, sst4 & sst5 receptors
 Trace amine-associated receptor 8

See also 
 Second messenger system
 G protein-coupled receptor
 Heterotrimeric G protein
 Adenylyl cyclase
 Protein kinase A
 Gs alpha subunit
 Gq alpha subunit
 G12/G13 alpha subunits
 Retina
 Taste

References

External links 
 

Peripheral membrane proteins